All Saints' Church, Mattersey is a Grade I listed parish church in the Church of England in Mattersey.

History
The church dates from the 13th century. There was restoration work in 1866. The church is noted for 2 un-restored, finely carved, early 14th century panels of the workshop of the Hawton Easter Sepulchre, probably brought from the Mattersey Priory. That on the east wall depicts St Martin dividing his cloak with the beggar, on the west wall St Helena finding the true cross.

The church is in a joint parish with:
St. Peter's Church, Clayworth
St Peter & St Paul's Church, Gringley-on-the-Hill
Holy Trinity Church, Everton

Organ
A specification of the organ can be found on the National Pipe Organ Register.

Clock
The tower clock is by G. & F. Cope of Nottingham and dates from 1921.

References

Church of England church buildings in Nottinghamshire
Grade I listed churches in Nottinghamshire